Monica Niculescu was the defending champion, but lost to Lauren Davis in the quarterfinals.

Océane Dodin won title, defeating Davis in the final, 6–4, 6–2.

Seeds 

  Monica Niculescu (quarterfinals)
  Pauline Parmentier (semifinals)
  Sorana Cîrstea (first round)
  Océane Dodin (champion)
  Nao Hibino (second round)
  Lauren Davis (final)
  Irina Khromacheva (first round)
  Stefanie Vögele (first round)

Main draw

Finals

Top half

Bottom half

References 
 Main draw

Internationaux Féminins de la Vienne - Singles